The Philippine magpie-robin (Copsychus mindanensis) is a species of bird in the family Muscicapidae.
It is endemic to the Philippines.  It used to be considered a subspecies of the Oriental magpie-robin.

Its natural habitats are subtropical or tropical dry forests and subtropical or tropical moist lowland forests.

Taxonomy
The Philippine magpie-robin was described by the French polymath Georges-Louis Leclerc, Comte de Buffon in 1775 in his Histoire Naturelle des Oiseaux from a specimen collected on the island of Mindanao in the Philippines. The bird was also illustrated in a hand-coloured plate engraved by François-Nicolas Martinet in the Planches Enluminées D'Histoire Naturelle which was produced under the supervision of Edme-Louis Daubenton to accompany Buffon's text.  Neither the plate caption nor Buffon's description included a scientific name but in 1783 the Dutch naturalist Pieter Boddaert coined the binomial name Turdus mindanensis in his catalogue of the Planches Enluminées. The Philippine magpie-robin is now one of 12 species placed in the genus Copsychus that was introduced by the German naturalist Johann Georg Wagler in 1827. It was formerly considered as a subspecies of the oriental magpie-robin (Copsychus saularis) but was promoted to species status based on the results of a molecular phylogenetic study that was published in 2009. The species is monotypic. The genus name Copsychus is from the Ancient Greek kopsukhos or kopsikhos for a "blackbird". The specific mindanensis comes from "Mindanao", the type locality.

References

Philippine magpie-robin
Endemic birds of the Philippines
Philippine magpie-robin
Philippine magpie-robin